Jellyfish Comes Alive was a promotional EP released in 1991 by Jellyfish. It collected live performances of songs from Bellybutton and covers of songs by Badfinger and Wings.

Track listing
"No Matter What" – 2:54
"The King Is Half-Undressed" – 3:55
"Now She Knows She's Wrong" – 2:51
"Let 'Em In/That Is Why" – 4:51
"Jet" – 3:58

Personnel
Andy Sturmer - vocals, drums
Roger Joseph Manning Jr. - keyboards, guitar, vocals
Jason Falkner - guitar, vocals
Chris Manning - bass, vocals

References

External links
Comes Alive at Discogs (list of releases).

1991 EPs
Jellyfish (band) albums